= Manikhedi Kot =

- village
- Location within Madhya Pradesh Location within India
- Coordinates: 23.3621744°N 77.3467996°E
- Country: India
- State: Madhya Pradesh
- District: Bhopal
- Tehsil: Huzur
- Elevation: 513 m (1,683 ft)

Population (2011)
  - Total: 384
- Time zone: UTC+5:30 (IST)
- ISO 3166 code: MP-IN
- 2011 census code: 482366

Manikhedi Kot is a village in the Bhopal district of Madhya Pradesh, India. It is located in the Huzur tehsil and the Phanda block.

== Demographics ==
According to the 2011 census of India, Manikhedi Kot has 75 households. The effective literacy rate (i.e. the literacy rate of population excluding children aged 6 and below) is 71.34%.

Demographics (2011 Census)
	Total	Male	Female
Population	384	204	180
Children aged below 6 years	56	29	27
Scheduled caste	39	23	16
Scheduled tribe	3	1	2
Literates	234	142	92
Workers (all)	208	122	86
Main workers (total)	108	105	3
Main workers: Cultivators	57	57	0
Main workers: Agricultural labourers	41	41	0
Main workers: Household industry workers	0	0	0
Main workers: Other	10	7	3
Marginal workers (total)	100	17	83
Marginal workers: Cultivators	56	11	45
Marginal workers: Agricultural labourers	36	3	33
Marginal workers: Household industry workers	0	0	0
Marginal workers: Others	8	3	5
Non-workers	176	82	94
